The Rally Liepāja–Ventspils was the second round of the 2014 European Rally Championship season, held in Latvia between 31 January and 2 February 2014.

The rally was won by Esapekka Lappi and co-driver Janne Ferm.

Results

References

2014 in Latvian sport
2014 European Rally Championship season
Rally Liepāja